Cory Efram Doctorow (born July 17, 1971) is a Canadian-British blogger, journalist, and science fiction author who served as co-editor of the blog Boing Boing. He is an activist in favour of liberalising copyright laws and a proponent of the Creative Commons organization, using some of their licences for his books. Some common themes of his work include digital rights management, file sharing, and post-scarcity economics.

Life and career
Cory Efram Doctorow was born in Toronto, Ontario, on 17 July 1971. He is of Eastern European Jewish descent. His paternal grandfather was born in what is now Poland and his paternal grandmother was from Leningrad. Both fled Nazi Germany's advance eastward during World War II, and as a result Doctorow's father was born in a displaced persons camp near Baku, Azerbaijan. His grandparents and father emigrated to Canada from the Soviet Union. Doctorow's mother's family were Ukrainian-Russian Romanians.

Doctorow was a friend of Columbia law professor Tim Wu, dating to their time together in elementary school. Doctorow went to summer camp as a young teenager at what he has described as a "hippy summer camp" at Grindstone Island, near Portland, Ontario, that was influential on his intellectual life and development. He quit high school, received his Ontario Academic Credit (high school diploma) from the SEED School in Toronto, and attended four universities without obtaining a degree.

Cory Doctorow has stated both that he is not related to the American novelist E. L. Doctorow and that he may be a third cousin once removed of the novelist.

In June 1999, Doctorow co-founded the free software P2P company Opencola with John Henson and Grad Conn, which sold to the Open Text Corporation of Waterloo, Ontario in the summer of 2003.  The company used a drink called OpenCola as part of its promotional campaign.

Doctorow later relocated to London and worked as European Affairs Coordinator for the Electronic Frontier Foundation for four years, helping to establish the Open Rights Group, before leaving the EFF to pursue writing full-time in January 2006; Doctorow remained a Fellow of the EFF for some time after his departure from the EFF Staff. He was named the 2006–2007 Canadian Fulbright Chair for Public Diplomacy at the USC Center on Public Diplomacy, sponsored jointly by the Royal Fulbright Commission, the Integrated Media Systems Center, and the USC Center on Public Diplomacy. The professorship included a one-year writing and teaching residency at the University of Southern California in Los Angeles, United States. He then returned to London, but remained a frequent public speaker on copyright issues.

In 2009, Doctorow became the first Independent Studies Scholar in Virtual Residence at the University of Waterloo in Ontario. He was a student in the program during 1993–94, but left without completing a thesis. Doctorow is also a Visiting Professor at the Open University in the United Kingdom. In 2012 he was awarded an honorary doctorate from The Open University.

Doctorow married Alice Taylor in October 2008; they have a daughter named Poesy Emmeline Fibonacci Nautilus Taylor Doctorow, who was born in 2008. Doctorow became a British citizen by naturalisation on 12 August 2011.

In 2015, Doctorow decided to leave London and move to Los Angeles, expressing disappointment at London's "death" after Britain's choice of Conservative government; he stated at the time, "London is a city whose two priorities are being a playground for corrupt global elites who turn neighbourhoods into soulless collections of empty safe-deposit boxes in the sky, and encouraging the feckless criminality of the finance industry. These two facts are not unrelated." He rejoined the EFF in January 2015 to campaign for the eradication of digital rights management (DRM).

Doctorow left Boing Boing in January 2020, and soon started a solo blogging project titled Pluralistic. The circumstances surrounding Doctorow's exit from the website were unclear at the time, although Doctorow acknowledged that he remained a co-owner of Boing Boing. Given the end of the 19-year association between Doctorow and Boing Boing, MetaFilter described this news as "the equivalent of the Beatles breaking up" for the blog world. Doctorow's exit was not acknowledged by Boing Boing, with his name being quietly removed from the list of editors on 29 January 2020.

Other work, activism, and fellowships

Doctorow served as Canadian Regional Director of the Science Fiction and Fantasy Writers of America in 1999.

In 2007, together with Austrian art group monochrom, he initiated the Instant Blitz Copy Fight project, which asks people from all over the world to take flash pictures of copyright warnings in movie theaters.

On October 31, 2005, Doctorow was involved in a controversy concerning digital rights management with Sony-BMG, as told in Wikinomics.

As a user of the Tor anonymity network for more than a decade during his global travels, Doctorow publicly supports the network; furthermore, Boing Boing operates a "high speed, high-quality exit node."

Doctorow was the keynote speaker at the July 2016 Hackers on Planet Earth conference.

Fiction
Doctorow began selling fiction when he was 17 years old, and sold several stories, followed by publication of the story "Craphound" in 1998.

Down and Out in the Magic Kingdom, Doctorow's first novel, was published in January 2003, and was the first novel released under one of the Creative Commons licences, allowing readers to circulate the electronic edition as long as they neither made money from it nor used it to create derived works. The electronic edition was released simultaneously with the print edition. In February 2004, it was re-released with a different Creative Commons license that allowed derivative works such as fan fiction, but still prohibited commercial usage.

Down and Out... was nominated for a Nebula Award, and won the Locus Award for Best First Novel in 2004. A semi-sequel short story named Truncat was published on Salon.com in August 2003.

His novel Someone Comes to Town, Someone Leaves Town, published in June 2005, was chosen to launch the Sci-Fi Channel's book club, Sci-Fi Essentials (now defunct).

Doctorow's other novels have been released with Creative Commons licences that allow derived works and prohibit commercial usage, and he has used the model of making digital versions available, without charge, at the same time that print versions are published.

His Sunburst Award-winning short story collection A Place So Foreign and Eight More was also published in 2004: "0wnz0red" from this collection was nominated for the 2004 Nebula Award for Best Novelette.

Doctorow released the bestselling novel Little Brother in 2008 with a Creative Commons Attribution-Noncommercial-ShareAlike licence. It was nominated for a Hugo Award for Best Novel in 2009. and won the 2009 Prometheus Award, Sunburst Award, and the 2009 John W. Campbell Memorial Award.

His novel Makers was released in October 2009, and was serialised for free on the Tor Books website.

Doctorow released another young adult novel, For the Win, in May 2010. The novel is available free on the author's website as a Creative Commons download, and is also published in traditional paper format by Tor Books. The book is about "greenfarming", and concerns massively multiplayer online role-playing games.

Doctorow's short story collection "With a Little Help" was released in printed format on May 3, 2011. It is a project to demonstrate the profitability of Doctorow's method of releasing his books in print and subsequently for free under Creative Commons.

In September 2012, Doctorow released The Rapture of the Nerds, a novel written in collaboration with Charles Stross.

Doctorow's  young adult novel Pirate Cinema was released in October 2012. It won the 2013 Prometheus Award.

In February 2013, Doctorow released Homeland, the sequel to his novel Little Brother. It won the 2014 Prometheus Award (Doctorow's third novel to win this award).

His novel Walkaway was released in 2017.

In March 2019, Doctorow released Radicalized, a collection of four self-contained science-fiction novellas dealing with how life in America could be in the near future. The book was selected for the 2020 edition of Canada Reads, in which it was defended by Akil Augustine.

Attack Surface, a standalone adult novel set in the "Little Brother" universe, was released on October 13, 2020.

Nonfiction and other writings
Doctorow's nonfiction works include his first book, The Complete Idiot's Guide to Publishing Science Fiction (co-written with Karl Schroeder and published in 2000), his contributions to Boing Boing, the blog he co-edits, as well as regular columns in the magazines Popular Science and Make. He is a contributing writer to Wired magazine, and contributes occasionally to other magazines and newspapers such as the New York Times Sunday Magazine, The Globe and Mail, Asimov's Science Fiction magazine, and the Boston Globe.

In 2004, he wrote an essay on Wikipedia included in The Anthology at the End of the Universe, comparing Internet attempts at Hitchhiker's Guide-type resources, including a discussion of the Wikipedia article about himself. Doctorow contributed the foreword to Sound Unbound: Sampling Digital Music and Culture (The MIT Press, 2008) edited by Paul D. Miller a.k.a. DJ Spooky. He also was a contributing writer to the book Worldchanging: A User's Guide for the 21st Century.

He popularised the term "metacrap" by a 2001 essay titled "Metacrap: Putting the torch to seven straw-men of the meta-utopia." Some of his non-fiction published between 2001 and 2007 has been collected by Tachyon Publications as Content: Selected Essays on Technology, Creativity, Copyright, and the Future of the Future. In 2016 he wrote the article Mr. Robot Killed the Hollywood-Hacker  (published on MIT Technology Review) as a review of the TV show Mr. Robot and argued for a better portrayal and understanding of technology, computers and their risks and consequences in our modern world.

His essay "You Can't Own Knowledge" is included in the Freesouls book project.

He is the originator of Doctorow's Law: "Anytime someone puts a lock on something you own, against your wishes, and doesn't give you the key, they're not doing it for your benefit."

Writing in the Guardian in2022, Doctorow listed the many problems confronting Facebook and suggested that its future would be increasingly fraught.

Opinions

Intellectual property

Doctorow believes that copyright laws should be liberalised to allow for free sharing of all digital media. He has also advocated filesharing. He argues that copyright holders should have a monopoly on selling their own digital media and that copyright laws should not be operative unless someone attempts to sell a product that is under someone else's copyright.

Doctorow is an opponent of digital rights management and claims that it limits the free sharing of digital media and frequently causes problems for legitimate users (including registration problems that lock users out of their own purchases and prevent them from being able to move their media to other devices).

He was a keynote speaker at the 2014 international conference CopyCamp in Warsaw, Poland with the presentation "Information Doesn't Want to Be Free."

Degradation of the online environment
Doctorow has criticised the process of the decay in usefulness of online platforms, coining the neologism 'enshittification':  "First they are good to their users; then they abuse their users to make things better for their business customers; finally, they abuse those business customers to claw back all the value for themselves".

In popular culture

The webcomic xkcd occasionally features a partially fictional version of Doctorow who lives in a hot air balloon up in the "blogosphere" ("above the tag clouds") and wears a red cape and goggles, such as in the comic "Blagofaire". When Doctorow won the 2007 EFF Pioneer Award, the presenters gave him a red cape, goggles and a balloon.

The novel Ready Player One features a mention of Doctorow as being the newly re-elected President of the OASIS User Council (with Wil Wheaton as his vice-president) in the year 2044, saying that, "those two geezers had been doing a kick-ass job of protecting user rights for over a decade."

The comedic role-playing game Kingdom of Loathing features a boss-fight against a monster named Doctor Oh, who is described as wearing a red cape and goggles. The commentary before the fight and assorted hit, miss and fumble messages during the battle make reference to Doctorow's advocacy for open-source sharing and freedom of media.

Awards

 2000 John W. Campbell Award for Best New Writer
 2004 Locus Award for Best First Novel for Down and Out in the Magic Kingdom
 2004 Sunburst Award for A Place So Foreign and Eight More
 2006 Locus Award for Best Novelette for "I, Robot"
 2007 Locus Award for Best Novelette for "When Sysadmins Ruled the Earth"
 2007 The Electronic Frontier Foundation Pioneer Award
For Little Brother
 2009 John W. Campbell Memorial Award
 2009 Prometheus Award
 2009 Sunburst Award
 2009 White Pine Award
 2018 Inkpot Award

For Pirate Cinema
 2013 Prometheus Award

For Homeland
 2014 Prometheus Award

Bibliography
In chronological sequence, unless otherwise indicated

Fiction

Novels 

 
 
 
The Great Big Beautiful Tomorrow, November 1, 2011, 
(with Charles Stross)

Little Brother Universe

Graphic novels 
In Real Life. Illustrated by Jen Wang. First Second. October 14, 2014. .
Poesy the Monster Slayer. Illustrated by Matt Rockefeller. First Second. July 14, 2020. .

Collections 
  or 
 
 
 Other instance:

Short fiction

Non-fiction
 
 
  Paper for the O'Reilly Emerging Technologies Conference, 2004.

References

Further reading

External links

 Cory Doctorow's personal website
 Pluralistic, daily links by Cory Doctorow
 
 
 
 
 Presentation of Cory Doctorow "Information Doesn’t Want to Be Free" at the CopyCamp 2014 conference

Interviews 
 2019 interview with Doctorow at Cyberpunks.com
 2020 interview with Doctorow  by Johannes Grenzfurthner in The Free Lunch magazine.
 2022 interview with Doctorow at sfss.space

1971 births
20th-century Canadian short story writers
21st-century Canadian novelists
21st-century Canadian short story writers
Academics of the Open University
Articles containing video clips
British activists
British bloggers
British Jewish writers
British podcasters
British science fiction writers
British technology journalists
British technology writers
Canadian activists
Canadian bloggers
Canadian emigrants to the United Kingdom
Canadian expatriates in the United States
Canadian male novelists
Canadian male short story writers
Canadian podcasters
Canadian science fiction writers
Canadian social commentators
Canadian technology writers
Copyright activists
Creative Commons-licensed authors
Cyberpunk writers
Inkpot Award winners
Internet activists
Jewish Canadian writers
John W. Campbell Award for Best New Writer winners
Journalists from Toronto
Living people
Naturalised citizens of the United Kingdom
University of Southern California faculty
Wired (magazine) people
Writers from Toronto
Fulbright alumni
Canadian people of Polish-Jewish descent
Canadian people of Russian-Jewish descent